1968 Campeonato Brasileiro Série A may stand for:

 1968 Campeonato Brasileiro Série A (Taça Brasil)
 1968 Campeonato Brasileiro Série A (Torneio Roberto Gomes Pedrosa)